Chuck Hartman (December 20, 1934 – November 2, 2020) was an American baseball coach who was the head coach at Virginia Tech from 1979 until 2006.  He completed his 47-year coaching career with the fourth most wins as coach in Division I baseball history.  His record was 1,444–816–8, including a 961–591–8 mark in his 28 seasons at Tech.  Coach Hartman was the second Virginia Tech baseball coach to be inducted into the American Baseball Coaches Association Hall of Fame, in 2004. He is a member of 5 halls of fame including the Virginia Tech Sports Hall of Fame, in which he was inducted in 2002. He died on November 2, 2020.

See also
List of college baseball coaches with 1,100 wins

References

External links 
Retirement Announcement from Hokiesports.com
Biography from Hokiesports.com
http://monogram.hokiesports.com/recognitions/hall_of_fame.html
VT Magazine Sports

1934 births
2020 deaths
High Point Panthers baseball coaches
North Carolina Tar Heels baseball players
Virginia Tech Hokies baseball coaches